The state of Victoria in Australia has had a long history of catastrophic bushfires, the most deadly of these, the Black Saturday bushfires of 2009 claiming 173 lives. Legislation, planning, management and suppression are the responsibilities of the Victorian State Government through its departments and agencies including the Country Fire Authority (CFA) and the Department of Environment, Land, Water and Planning (DELWP).

Fire districts
Victoria is divided into nine fire districts as follows:
Central (includes Melbourne, Geelong and Ballarat)
East Gippsland
Mallee
North Central
Northeast
Northern Country
West & South Gippsland
Western District
Wimmera

The districts were reconfigured together with weather forecast districts so that they share common alignments. The revised alignments follow Local Government Authority boundaries, except in Yarriambiack Shire. The new alignments came into effect on 3 November 2010. Total Fire Bans & Fire Danger Ratings maps reflect predictions of the relative danger of bushfire conditions in each district and are communicated to the general public through weather forecasts and the Country Fire Authority and Department of Environment and Primary Industries internet sites during the fire season. The ratings are Low-Moderate, High, Very High, Severe, Extreme and Code Red.

Fire management

Suppression
A number of agencies are responsible for bushfire suppression in Victoria - the Country Fire Authority (CFA) which is a statewide volunteer-based organisation, the Department of Environment, Land, Water & Planning (DELWP) who are responsible for public land, covering one third of the state and the Metropolitan Fire Brigade (MFB), which covers the metropolitan area of Melbourne.

Parks Victoria is a government agency which also assiduously maintains the majority of Victoria's wetlands, national parks, marine parks and parklands. Parks Victoria takes part regularly in planned burning and fuel reduction burns which aim to reduce the potential impact of bushfires. Around 70% of Parks Victoria's staff are trained in specific fire fighting roles. Many of those staff are deployed each summer in Victoria to assist in fighting fires. Parks Victoria openly states that it supports the Department of Environment, Land, Water and Planning (DELWP).

Bushfire warnings
Once fires have started, the Country Fire Authority give graded warnings through various means to areas of settlements that may be affected by the fire. These warnings are distributed as messages detailing the status of the fire, its potential movements and give advice to residents in areas that may be affected. They are as follows:

Emergency Alert telephone warnings may be sent in extreme circumstances. Landlines in the emergency area receive voice messages and mobile phones (with a billing address in the emergency area) receive text messages. Emergency broadcasts are made on local ABC and commercial radio stations and Sky News television. Information can also be sought by telephone from the Victorian Bushfire Information Line. During an emergency, the Standard Emergency Warning Signal is played via television, radio and public address systems.

Current bushfire incidents and warnings are listed on the VicEmergency website launched in December 2013, Information is also available through the CFA's Twitter and Facebook sites as well as the FireReady app.

A 90-second siren at a CFA fire station indicates that CFA members are attending an emergency incident. A prolonged, 5-minute siren is targeted at the local community, indicating that there is an emergency in the area and further information should be sought.

Fuel-reduction burning
Planned burning is carried out by the Department of Environment, Land, Water & Planning at certain times of year to reduce fuel levels in parks and reserves throughout the state.

Planning

Bushfire Management Overlays
Bushfire Management Overlays are areas identified in planning schemes within each of the Local Government Areas of Victoria that are deemed to have high fire risk. These areas are subject to particular planning and building controls.

Vegetation removal
Following the Black Saturday bushfires of 2009, interim measures were introduced by the State Government to permit vegetation removal in bushfire prone areas. The exemptions include removal of vegetation (including trees) within 10 metres of existing residences as well as all vegetation (excluding trees) within 30 metres. The measures expire on 1 March 2012.

Building standards
The Victorian Government has adopted the residential building Australian Standard  to cover the location, design, construction of new dwellings in bushfire prone areas. The new standard includes consideration of Bushfire Attack Levels which are based on a number of factors including slope, proximity of vegetation and Fire Danger Index. New interim regulations have also been introduced for the construction of private bushfire shelters or bunkers.

Community Information Guides
The CFA, in consultation with councils and stakeholder groups, have developed Community Information Guides for locations in Victoria that are deemed to be in high risk areas. These are mailed to residents and are available on the CFA website. The guides provide emergency contact details, a map and information on preparations, planned emergency service actions and bushfire survival options. Some of these guides include designated Neighbourhood Safer Places which are sanctuaries of "last resort" during a bushfire emergency.

Common causes
Common causes of bushfire, figures for Victoria over a 20-year period. Lightning is the most common cause, igniting the highest number of bushfires, which subsequently account for nearly half of the area burnt by bushfires in the state. Deliberately lit fires are the next most common, although burn much less area than fires ignited by lightning. Public utilities, such as powerlines, ignite relatively few fires, but these subsequently burn similar area to that of deliberately lit fires.

Cigarettes, matches and such, ignite a fair few fires, mostly in and around urban areas, and thus burn small areas of land as they are attended to more easily in the more accessible terrain. Many fires are caused by many other less common ignition sources or have unknown causes.

By number of fires

Lightning - 26%
Deliberate - 25%
Agricultural - 16%
Campfire - 10%
Cigarettes/Matches - 7%
Unknown Causes - 6%
Misc - 5%
Machinery/Exhausts - 3%
Planned burn escapes - 2%
Public Utilities - 1%

By area burnt
Lightning - 46%
Public Utilities - 14%
Deliberate - 14%
Misc - 9%
Agricultural - 7%
Planned burn escapes - 5%
Unknown Causes - 3%
Machinery/Exhaust - 2%
Campfire - 1%
Cigarettes/Matches - less than 1%

Major Victorian Bushfires

Most extensive fires
1851 - 6 February "Black Thursday" (5 million hectares)
1938-39 - December - January "Black Friday" (2 million hectares)
2020 - 3 January "Victoria/NSW Mega Blaze" (1.5+ million hectares)
2003 - January - March "2003 Eastern Victorian alpine bushfires" (1.3 million hectares)
2006-07 - 1 December - 6 February "Eastern Victoria Great Divide bushfires" (1.2 -1.3 million hectares)
1944 - January - February (1 million hectares)
1983 - 16 February "Ash Wednesday" (510,000 hectares)
2009 - 7 February "Black Saturday" (450,000 hectares)
1965 - Gippsland (300,000 hectares)
1898 - 1 February "Red Tuesday" (260,000 hectares)

Deadliest fires
2009 - 7 February - March "Black Saturday" (173 deaths)
1939 - December - January "Black Friday" (71 deaths)
1926 - 14 February - March "Black Sunday" (60 deaths)
1944 - December - February (51 deaths)
1983 - 16 February "Ash Wednesday" (47 in Victoria)
1962 - 14–16 January (33 deaths)
1969 - 8 January (23 deaths)
1942 - Western Victoria (20 deaths)
1905 - 1 December (12 deaths)
1898 - 1 February "Red Tuesday" (12 deaths)
1851 - 6 February "Black Thursday" (12 deaths)
1943 - 22 December (10 deaths)
1952 - January - March, Central Victoria (10 deaths)
1977 - 12 February, Western Victoria (8 deaths)
1965 - 17 January (7 deaths) Longwood, Northern Victoria
1998 - 2 December (5 deaths) Linton, Western Victoria
1985 - 14 January (3 deaths) Avoca, Central Victoria
1997 - 21 January (3 deaths) Dandenong Ranges

See also
Wildfire
Bushfires in Australia
 2015–16 Australian bushfire season
2019–20 Australian bushfire season
Aerial firefighting and forestry in southern Australia

References

DSE Major Bushfire in Victoria
Anatomy of a firestorm, The Age

External links
State Library of Victoria's Bushfires in Victoria Research Guide Guide to locating books, government reports, websites, statistics, newspaper reports and images about Victorian bushfires from 1851 to the present.
Country Fire Authority
Department of Environment, Land, Water & Planning: Fire & emergencies
 VicEmergency (Incidents and warnings)

 Bushfires
Environment of Victoria (Australia)